Ramaricium is a genus of fungi in the family Gomphaceae. The genus contains three species that collectively have a widespread distribution.

References

External links

Gomphaceae
Agaricomycetes genera